Bingham Road railway station was in Addiscombe, Croydon on the Woodside and South Croydon Joint Railway. It was opened on 1 September 1906 on the north side of Bingham Road, with two wooden platforms without buildings and was closed on 15 March 1915 as a wartime economy measure. A new station on the south side of Bingham Road was opened in 1935 and finally closed in 1983. The modern Addiscombe tram stop (open 2000) at ground level is situated at the location of the first halt closed in 1915 which was situated on an embankment above the present site.

History

A  link between the Mid-Kent Line at Woodside and the Oxted Line at  known as the Woodside and South Croydon Joint Railway was authorised in 1880. Opened on 10 August 1885, it was jointly worked by the London, Brighton and South Coast Railway and the South Eastern Railway.

As part of a scheme to increase patronage using Kitson steam railmotors designed by Wainwright, a railway halt was provided on the north side of Bingham Road in Addiscombe on 1 September 1906. , also on the Woodside and South Croydon line, was opened on the same day, part of four such halts in the London area; the others being  and Beeches Halt. The site chosen for Bingham Road station was adjacent to the Addiscombe terminus of the Croydon Corporation Tramways' service. Facilities consisted of two  wooden platforms, with the tickets for passengers joining or leaving the train being sold or collected by the guard.

Despite new construction along the route of the line, passenger loadings were light and working expenses generally exceeded farebox revenue. The line was a candidate for wartime economies during the First World War and the halts at Bingham Road and Spencer Road were closed on 14 March 1915 upon which the railmotor service ceased, with full closure of the line following on 31 December 1916. The line was reopened and electrified by the Southern Railway on 30 September 1935. Bingham Road was rebuilt at a cost of £10,000, with brick entrances and covered staircases provided either side of the road underbridge, as well as concrete platforms covered by wood and steel glass canopies.

The station's platforms were nevertheless extended as part of a mid-1950s scheme to allow it to accommodate 10-car trains. Full closure was proposed in the Beeching Report but a reprieve was granted on the basis that some hardship would be caused. A local pressure group was formed to fight the closure, claiming there was no alternative and, after several public meetings, the Ministry of Transport rejected the closure plans because of the hardship it would cause to the 650 daily passengers using the line. In 1980, a passenger count revealed that only 116 passengers were using Bingham Road daily. The inevitable closure of the line came in 1983, with the last train departing at 19:30 from Sanderstead on Friday 13 May and official closure following on 16 May.

The station featured in The Rebel (1961) starring Tony Hancock and George Sanders where it was known as Fortune Green South.
The sequence showing the dress-code regimentation of the commuters on the platform should be compared to the reverie in which Anthony Steel indulges in Something Money Can't Buy, in 1952.

Present day
The track was lifted soon after closure and demolition of the wooden station buildings took place after they had been vandalised. Tramlink services reusing the railway alignment at Bingham Road commenced on 10 May 2000; the formation is no longer elevated as the former railway embankment has been removed and trams run on the level. A solitary fragment of broken wall which formed part of the old Up side entrance still remained in April 2003.

Addiscombe tram stop is on the north (ie. opposite) side of  Bingham Road, using the site of the first halt.

References

Notes

Sources

External links

 Page at Disused Stations

Disused railway stations in the London Borough of Croydon
Former Woodside and South Croydon Joint Railway stations
Railway stations in Great Britain opened in 1906
Railway stations in Great Britain closed in 1915
Railway stations in Great Britain opened in 1935
Railway stations in Great Britain closed in 1983
Former Southern Railway (UK) stations
1906 establishments in England
1915 disestablishments in England
1935 establishments in England
1983 disestablishments in England